The slender catshark (Schroederichthys tenuis) is a small species of catshark belonging to the family Scyliorhinidae.

Description
The snout is relatively broad and rounded, the mouth is wide and the nostrils are concealed by lobed flaps. The second dorsal fin is larger than the first and the upper lobe of the tail fin is much larger than the lower lobe. The general colour of the dorsal (upper) surface is pale brown and there are seven or eight dark brown saddle-shaped patches with a scattering of dark brown spots between them.

Distribution
The slender catshark seems to be endemic to the upper continental slope of the coast of Brazil and Suriname including the Amazon estuary, between 4°N and 2°S . It has also been reported from the southwestern Atlantic Ocean off the coast of Patagonia but this may have been a case of misidentification.

Biology
The slender catshark mostly feeds on small fish, crustaceans, molluscs and squid. Examination of the stomach contents of captured individuals shows that its diet also includes foraminifera and sponges, and the dermal denticles of other sharks have also been found. This species is oviparous with one or two eggs being laid, each enclosed in a tough egg-case with curly tendrils at each end.

Status
The slender catshark is a little studied shark and the IUCN has rated it as "least concern" in its Red List of Threatened Species. The population size and trend is unknown but the shark has a limited range and may be vulnerable to pollution in the Amazon River water. It is sometimes caught as bycatch by artisan fishermen while they are trawling for shrimps and other commercially fished catsharks. It is possible that it is increasingly being targeted by fishermen, and if this is the case, the IUCN would be concerned.

References

slender catshark
Fish of Suriname
Fish of French Guiana
Fish of Brazil
slender catshark